Raipur is a village in Khiron block of Rae Bareli district, Uttar Pradesh, India. It is located 5 km from Lalganj, the tehsil headquarters. As of 2011, it has a population of 1,283 people, in 241 households. It has one primary school and no healthcare facilities.

The 1961 census recorded Raipur as comprising 4 hamlets, with a total population of 733 people (351 male and 382 female), in 118 households and 107 physical houses. The area of the village was given as 409 acres and it had a post office at that point.

The 1981 census recorded Raipur as having a population of 958 people, in 227 households, and having an area of 166.73 hectares. The main staple foods were given as wheat and rice.

References

Villages in Raebareli district